Gurney Drive is a popular seafront promenade within George Town, Penang, Malaysia. The road is also famous for the street cuisine at the seafront's hawker centre and has been listed as one of the 25 best streets worldwide to visit by the Australian travel magazine, The Traveler. In addition, Gurney Drive has become part of George Town's second Central Business District due to the mushrooming of skyscrapers and shopping malls.

Previously known as the New Coast Road, it was completed in 1936 along what was then known as the North Beach and renamed in 1952 after Sir Henry Gurney, British High Commissioner in Malaya (1950–1951), who was assassinated by the guerrillas of the Malayan Communist Party during the Malayan Emergency.

Over the years, the beaches along Gurney Drive have largely been lost to coastal erosion. More recently, a land reclamation project at nearby Tanjung Tokong has reversed the erosion, leading to the accretion of silt and mud off Gurney Drive. Mangrove saplings have sprouted in the mud, which is now frequented by egrets and other birds as well as mudskippers.

As of 2016, the shoreline off Gurney Drive is being reclaimed for the purpose of creating a public recreational park named Gurney Wharf.

History

Gurney Drive sits on reclaimed land created off Teluk Ayer Rajah, the bay that once existed between George Town and Tanjung Tokong. The intention to build a coastal road was already planned as early as 1930 as an extension of Northam Road (now Jalan Sultan Ahmad Shah). The first  of Gurney Drive was completed in 1934, and at that time, it was simply named "North Beach".

Gurney Drive was initially named as New Coast Road. It was then renamed Gurney Drive in honour of Sir Henry Gurney, the British High Commissioner in Malaya who had been assassinated by communist guerrillas in Pahang in 1951.

However, a few years later, a debate erupted over the renaming of Gurney Drive. It was proposed that, with the independence of Malaya imminent at the time, Gurney Drive should be renamed Merdeka Drive. To compensate for the renaming of the road, a bust of the late Sir Henry Gurney was to be constructed. The Municipal Commissioners who opposed the renaming of Gurney Drive then wrote directly to Gurney's wife, who was said to have taken 'the change very bravely and even offered to help with regard to the statue or bust'. A sculptor in London, David McFall, offered to create the bust for $4,500.

When the recommendation for the provision of $6,000 for the bust was reviewed by the Finance Committee of the Municipal Council, it was eventually decided to not only to defer the provision of the bust but also that the drive should continue to be called Gurney Drive.

In 1962, a section of Gurney Drive was planted with casuarina trees. A councillor subsequently suggested that the City Council should consider renaming Gurney Drive into "Casuarina Drive" or "Casuarina Beach". The suggestion was never implemented, and today, the section where the casuarina trees were planted remains a distinct, leafy part of the seaside promenade.

Gurney Drive was once a sandy beach where people could collect seashells i.e. siput remis or small mussels which were abundant back then. The seawater was so clean and pollution-free that it became a venue for dragon boat races from the 1960s to 1980s. Back then people would swim in the sea and fishermen would return to the beach with their catches, especially for fishes and king crabs along the shore.

However, such excitement of these events and the clear water is much lost now. The Seri Tanjung Pinang land reclamation project at nearby Tanjung Tokong had led to an accumulation of silt and mud along Gurney Drive, thus allowing mangrove trees to grow along the shoreline. Until recently, there were suggestions that this area, formerly earmarked for reclamation under the suspended Penang Outer Ring Road project, be reclaimed for a recreational park or allowed to be developed into a mangrove forest.

Gurney Drive is home to many prominent pre-war houses, colonial bungalows and the College General Complex, which was once used to train Catholic priests in Thailand, India, China, Japan and Myanmar.

In addition, two famous shopping malls - Gurney Plaza and Gurney Paragon - as well as numerous high-rise hotels and condominiums, are located along Gurney Drive. Land reclamation is also currently ongoing off Gurney Drive to create Gurney Wharf, a proposed public recreational park which will include a food and beverages (F&B) area, a man-made beach and water gardens. The first phase of the project is slated for completion by 2018.

Landmarks

Affluent beach-side bungalows were located here, many of which are today incorporated into the design of upscale condominiums. At the Pangkor Road end of Gurney Drive was the fabulous mansion of Kapitan China Chung Thye Phin, son of Kapitan China Chung Keng Quee, occupied today by One Persiaran Gurney condominiums.

While Gurney Drive has some of the most modern skyscrapers in Penang, it is also where opulent bungalows of the colonial era still stand. One of these is the Loke Mansion. Also at Gurney Drive is the St Joseph's Novitiate, which is now part of Gurney Paragon.

Shopping centers
Gurney Plaza
Gurney Paragon
Gurney Walk

Food
Gurney Drive Hawker Centre is one of the largest and most well-known local eateries in Penang. It has been relocated a few times and is presently located at the northern end of Gurney Drive, just before the Gurney roundabout, between Sunrise Tower and Gurney Plaza. The Gurney Drive Hawker Centre has been around since the early 1970s, and is probably the best-known place for visitors to Penang to savour the local hawker fare.

Over the years, the price at the hawker centre has risen higher than at coffee shops elsewhere in Penang, due to popularity of the hawker centre among out-of-town visitors and general commercialisation. Food sold at the hawker centre include char kuey teow, Hokkien mee, jiu hoo eng chye (spinach with cuttlefish), koay teow th'ng, lok lok, mee goreng, Jawa mee, mee rebus, pasembur, rojak, satay, soya beancurd (douhua) and many more. The hawker centre has both a halal and non-halal section.

Condominiums

Gurney Park Condominium
Gurney Beach Condominium
Gurney Palace Condominium 
1 Persiaran Gurney
8 Gurney
11 Gurney Drive
Gurney Paragon
Acadia
Desa Mas
Millennium Tower
Silverton
The Regency
Sunrise SOHO 
Sunrise Tower
Setia V Residences
Marriott Residences (not yet opened)
H Residences

Hotels
Evergreen Laurel Hotel
G Hotel Gurney
G Hotel Kelawai
Ascott Hotel
Marriott hotel (not yet opened)

See also 
 George Town CBD
List of tallest buildings in George Town

References

External links

Tourism Malaysia - Gurney Drive

Roads in Penang
George Town, Penang
Tourist attractions in George Town, Penang
Shopping districts and streets in Malaysia
Waterfronts